Sister Anne Nasimiyu Wasike, LSOSF (died on 22 February 2018) was a Ugandan Catholic theologian, religious sister, and author of books and articles on education, ethics and the empowerment of the poor.  She was also editor of several publications. She was a member of a Franciscan African Order of nuns called "The Little Sisters of St Francis."

Wasike addressed the United Nations General Assembly Special Session in 2001 on the plight of women and the girl-child in Africa in the age of HIV/AIDS. She was a founding member of the Ecumenical Association of Third World Theologians.

Wasike was also a founding member of the Circle of Concerned African Women Theologians, a pan African organization of African Women founded under the leadership of Mercy Amber Oduyoye in 1989. The circle is known for being a prophetic voice as they name and shame sexism in church and society and they struggle particularly to end gender based violence and exploitation of women. She is said to have called the world to recognize and apply Afro-Christian theo ethics as a viable way of seeking a livable and humane world.

Early life and education 
Anne Wasike was the daughter of Matayo Wasike and Annastasia Nanyama. She was a sister to Priscah, Isaac, Sabina, Priscilla, John, Immanuel, Chachi and Patrick. Wasike was a trained teacher who received her Master of Arts degree in Religious Education at Gannon University, Pennsylvania, USA and her PhD in Systematic Theology from Duquesne University, USA. She was the first African woman theologian to earn a PhD in theology.

Career 
Wasike authored a journal called Seeds of Mutuality in Mission: Response to Anne Nasimiyu-Wasike which was first published on January 1, 2001 as a research article. The journal lays out several challenges for people from the West. These include the need to have a greater sensitivity and knowledge of the richness and complexity of the African culture.

Wasike served as the Superior General of the Little Sisters of Saint Francis with their headquarters in Nkokonjeru, Uganda on two terms each of six years. She served at Kenyatta University, Nairobi for 24 years in the 1980s and 1990s in the Department of Philosophy and Religious Studies. She was appointed the Director of Student Affairs and was able to teach and mentor so many students. She was an organiser and administrator who ensured others were empowered by equipping them.

Wasike was a scholar and teacher of African Theology and African Religions and Cultures. She was an active participant in the Sagana group that met annually to discuss emerging issues in African Christian Theology and practice and outcomes of the consultations were edited and published by Jesse N Mugambi under the African (theology) Challenge series as the convener of the Sagana group. She taught courses, published and facilitated research  meant to deepen awareness of and respect for African spiritualities. She was a champion of what is known in Catholic circles as "inculturation theology". In 1992, she coedited Moral and Ethical Issues in African Christianity Exploratory Essays in Moral Theology, with J. N Mugambi which became one of the several volumes in the African Challenge series.

Death and legacy
Wasike died after a short illness, thought to be malaria. She is buried at her late mother's house in Nkokonjeru, located in the central part of Uganda on 3 March 2018. A tribute appeared in the Daily Nation on 26 February 2018. She was credited by Irimina Nungari, who was her predecessor as superior general and Cecilia Njeri, head of the Little Sisters of Saint Francis, for championing the organization of the archives of their congregation as well as drawing solid development plans.

Bibliography
 
 
 
 

Thesis

See also 
 Mount St Mary's College Namagunga, Lugazi, Uganda
 Just Love: A Framework for Christian Sexual Ethics
 Margaret A. Farley

References

External links 
 Inculturation of the concept of God in the traditional religion on the Abagusii of Western Kenya
 The Role of Lamentation in African Biblical Hermeneutics: A Post-Colonial Reading of the Bible among Gĩkũyũ People of Kenya
 Re-imagining African Christologies: Conversing with the Interpretations
Is Mutuality Possible? An African Response

2018 deaths
Ugandan women journalists
Ugandan journalists
Ugandan women academics
Academic staff of Kenyatta University
Female Christian missionaries
Year of birth missing